Wu Bixian (born 7 December 1913, date of death unknown) was a Chinese athlete. He competed in the men's high jump at the 1936 Summer Olympics.

References

External links

1913 births
Year of death missing
Athletes (track and field) at the 1936 Summer Olympics
Chinese male high jumpers
Olympic athletes of China